Rhys Hayden (born 8 October 1994) is an English darts player, currently playing in British Darts Organisation events. He qualified for the 2015 BDO World Darts Championship. His nickname is Lightning.

Career

BDO
He reached the Last 16 of the 2014 World Masters in Hull, where he beat Wesley Harms in the first round before losing to the eventual winner of the tournament Martin Phillips. He qualified for the 2015 BDO World Darts Championship through the qualifiers where he played Jim Widmayer in the preliminary round losing 2-3 in sets after leading 2-0.

World Championship results

BDO
 2015: Preliminary round (lost to Jim Widmayer 2–3)

External links
Rhys Hayden's profile and stats on Darts Database

References

Living people
English darts players
British Darts Organisation players
1994 births
Sportspeople from Bradford
Professional Darts Corporation associate players